Cerro El Pital is a mountain in Central America, on the border of El Salvador and Honduras.

It is one of the most popular tourist draws in El Salvador, with great biodiversity in a wide altitudinal range containing many endangered species of flora and fauna. The cloud forest has some of the rarest plants and animals in the country, including quetzals and other endangered species.

It is the coldest place in El Salvador. On 13 April 2004, much of the mountain was blanketed by an accumulation of hail during a storm, an unusual event that caused a commotion among the local community.

References 

El Pital
Mountains of Honduras
El Salvador–Honduras border
International mountains of North America
Chalatenango Department
Ocotepeque Department
Highest points of countries